The 1985 NCAA Division I-AA Football Championship Game was a postseason college football game between the Furman Paladins and the Georgia Southern Eagles. The game was played on December 21, 1985, at the Tacoma Dome in Tacoma, Washington. The culminating game of the 1985 NCAA Division I-AA football season, it was won by Georgia Southern, 44–42.

Contemporary news reports also referred to this game as the Diamond Bowl, as the NCAA had introduced Diamond Bowl branding for the Division I-AA championship game earlier in the year.

Teams
The participants of the Championship Game were the finalists of the 1985 I-AA Playoffs, which began with a 12-team bracket.

Georgia Southern Eagles

Georgia Southern finished their regular season with a 9–2 record. Ranked ninth in the final NCAA I-AA in-house poll and unseeded in the tournament, the Eagles defeated Jackson State, top-seed Middle Tennessee State, and fourth-seed Northern Iowa to reach the final. This was the first appearance for Georgia Southern in a Division I-AA championship game.

Furman Paladins

Furman finished their regular season with a 10–1 record (6–0 in conference); one of their wins came against NC State, a Division I-A program, and their only defeat was an upset loss to Newberry, an NAIA program. Tied for second in the final NCAA I-AA in-house poll and seeded third in the tournament, the Paladins received a first-round bye then defeated Rhode Island and second-seed Nevada to reach the final. This was also the first appearance for Furman in a Division I-AA championship game.

Game summary
Furman built a 28–6 lead with just under 11 minutes left in the third quarter. By the time that quarter had ended, Georgia Southern had fought back to tie the score, 28–28. The two teams traded touchdowns in the first half of the fourth quarter, remaining tied, 35–35. A Georgia Southern field goal was answered by a Furman touchdown, giving Furman a 42–38 lead with just over two minutes to play. Georgia Southern then staged a 72-yard drive in 82 seconds, scoring the winning touchdown with just 10 seconds left on the clock.

Scoring summary

Game statistics

References

Further reading

External links
 1985 I-AA National Championship - Georgia Southern vs Furman via YouTube

Championship Game
NCAA Division I Football Championship Games
Furman Paladins football games
Georgia Southern Eagles football games
Sports competitions in Tacoma, Washington
American football competitions in Washington (state)
NCAA Division I-AA Football Championship Game
NCAA Division I-AA Football Championship Game